The Turnir (Russian: Турнир, meaning Tournament) is a dedicated first-generation home video game console that was manufactured by the Ministry of the Electronics Industry and released in 1978 only in the Soviet Union. It was manufactured between 1978 and 1982 and is the only known Soviet video game console that uses the AY-3-8500 chipset from General Instrument. The price for the system varied from 150 Soviet rubles in 1978 to 96 rubles in the late 1980s. The console uses an integrated AC adapter with a voltage of 9 volt and has a mass of 2.5 kg.

Games 
Due to the integrated AY-8-8500 chip, the Turnir is able to play the following four games:

 (Pong clone)
 (Hockey)
 (Squash)
 (Training)

References 

1970s toys
Dedicated consoles
First-generation video game consoles
Pong variations
Video games developed in Russia
Ministry of the Electronics Industry (Soviet Union) products